Edward Meyrick   (25 November 1854, in Ramsbury – 31 March 1938, at Thornhanger, Marlborough) was an English schoolmaster and amateur entomologist.  He was an expert on microlepidoptera and some consider him one of the founders of modern microlepidoptera systematics.

Life and work
Edward Meyrick came from a Welsh clerical family and was born in Ramsbury on the Kennet  to a namesake father. He was educated at Marlborough College and Trinity College, Cambridge. He actively pursued his hobby during his schooling, and one colleague stated in 1872 that Meyrick "has not left a lamp, a paling, or a tree unexamined in which a moth could possibly, at any stage of its existence, lie hid." Meyrick began publishing notes on microlepidopterans in 1875, but when in December, 1877 he gained a post at The King's School, Parramatta, New South Wales, there were greater opportunities for indulging his interest. He stayed in Australia for ten years (from 1877 until the end of 1886) working at Sydney Grammar School before returning to England to teach classics at Marlborough College and become a corresponding member of the Linnean Society of New South Wales. He was the author of the Handbook of British Lepidoptera (1895) and of Exotic Microlepidoptera (March 1912 – November 1937), the latter consisting of four complete volumes and part of a fifth. He also wrote a number of short papers.

Meyrick was a life-long member of the Conservative party, and spent twelve years as president of the East Wilts Unionist Association.

Meyrick was a fellow of the Royal Entomological Society of London and a fellow of the Royal Society. During his lifetime, he may have described more than 20,000 species of Lepidoptera. His huge collection of specimens (over 100,000) is at the Natural History Museum, London. It is believed that he had collected more specimens than anyone else. He encouraged scientific studies by amateurs and in a 1898 article,  "Scientific Work in Local Societies ”  he pointed out lines of research for members of Natural History Societies. His studies of Australian and New Zealand lepidoptera led him to suggest that the two were not formerly connected. He made use of ideas along the lines of Dollo's laws to postulate principles to use to examine the evolution of the lepidoptera. In his Handbook of British Lepidoptera (1895) he stated that (1) No new organ can be produced except as a modification of some previously existing structure; (2) A lost  organ cannot be regained; and (3)  A rudimentary organ is rarely re-developed.

Edward Mayrick died after a brief illness and is buried in the churchyard at Ramsbury, Wiltshire.

References

External links 
Biography National Library New Zealand
Biographical Database of South African Science portrait
Bright Sparcs, University of Melbourne

A Handbook of British Lepidoptera via Internet Archive
Exotic Microlepidoptera volumes 1 and 2 via Biodiversity Heritage Library 

1854 births
1938 deaths
19th-century British zoologists
20th-century British zoologists
Alumni of Trinity College, Cambridge
English lepidopterists
English taxonomists
Fellows of the Royal Entomological Society
Fellows of the Royal Society
Fellows of the Zoological Society of London
People educated at Marlborough College
 01
Place of birth missing
Place of death missing